The National Youth Jazz Orchestra (NYJO) is a British jazz orchestra founded in 1965 by Bill Ashton. In 2010. Mark Armstrong took over as Music Director of the flagship performing band, and Artistic Director of the organisation; Bill Ashton became Life President, and Nigel Tully became Executive Chair. In July 2021, Susy York Skinner became the Chief Executive.

Based in the Royal Arsenal, London, England, NYJO started life as the London Schools' Jazz Orchestra, and evolved into becoming the National Youth Jazz Orchestra. Its aims are to provide an opportunity for gifted young musicians from around the UK to perform big band jazz in major concert halls, theatres, and on radio and television, and to make recordings, commission new works from British composers and arrangers, and to introduce a love of jazz to as wide an audience as possible, but especially to schoolchildren.

The performing band, NYJO, is selected by audition and invitation, and has a maximum age of 25. It performs around 40 gigs a year across the UK, the vast majority involving additional inspirational educational workshops for local schoolchildren, in partnership with the local Music Hub. It rehearses every Saturday at Woolwich Works, part of Woolwich's Royal Arsenal Riverside complex.

In 2011, a new band, NYJO London, was created to focus on developing school aged jazz musicians in greater London. In 2013, NYJO's London training and education activities were brought together under the banner of the NYJO Academy, now the NYJO Under 18s program, which focuses on small and large ensemble jazz projects.

In April 2015, NYJO became an Arts Council England National Portfolio Organisation (NPO), in recognition of its unique role as an excellent youth arts institution and its ability to inspire young people to like and enjoy jazz. At the same time NYJO acquired jazz's first ever Royal patron, the Earl of Wessex, who had seen the band perform live at Buckingham Palace in December 2014.

NYJO has an extensive discography of over 40 recordings. A new double CD album entitled NYJO FIFTY was released in late 2015 to celebrate the 50th anniversary of NYJO's formation, with guest appearances by alumnus Mark Nightingale and by Zoe Rahman and Julian Siegel, both of whom were commissioned to write new works for the album. In 2022 NYJO released an album showcasing works by female jazz composers, entitled "She Said". It features music from Nikki Iles, Yazz Ahmed and Norma Winstone among others. 

NYJO's members have included many of the major names in British jazz over the last three decades, including Julian Argüelles, Guy Barker, Chris Biscoe, Richard James Burgess, Paul Edmonds, Teresa Gallagher, Steve Hill, David Wood, Nigel Hitchcock, Carol Kenyon, Dave O'Higgins, Simon Phillips, Gerard Presencer, Brian Priestley, Frank Ricotti, Jamie Talbot, Dave Watts, Tom Cawley, Gareth Lockrane, Harrison Wood, Louis Dowdeswell, Callum Au, Chris White, Amy Winehouse, Bobby Worth and Neil Yates.

Discography 
1971: The National Youth Jazz Orchestra - Play The Music Of Alan Cohen, Graham Collier, John Dankworth & Others
1973: National Youth Jazz Orchestra
1975: 11 Plus-Live At London Weekend Television
1976: Return Trip
1977: In Camra
1978: To Russia With Jazz
1979: Mary Rose
1980: Down Under
1980: The Sherwood Forest Suite
1982: Playing Turkey
1983: Why Don't They Write Songs Like This Anymore - Litsa Davies
1984:  Born Again - Shorty Rogers
1985: Full Score
1985: Concrete Cows - John Dankworth
1986: With An Open Mind
1987: Concerto for Guitar and Jazz Orchestra - Paul Hart, John Williams  
1987: Shades Of Blue & Green - with Lorraine Craig
1988: Maltese Cross
1989: Big Band Christmas
1990: Cooking With Gas
1990: Portraits - (The Music Of Harry South)
1991: Remembrance
1991: These are the Jokes
1993: Looking Forward Looking Back
1994: Hallmark
1995: Cottoning On
1995: In Control
1996: A View From The Hill
1996: Algarhythms
1997: Unison In All Things
1997: With One Voice
1998: 47 Frith Street
1999: Stepping Stones
2000: Who's Blue
2002: This Time Live at the Club
2003: Jasmine
2003: A Merry Christmas and a Happy New Year
2004: Jazz In Film
2005: Something Old Something New
2005: Two Suites
2006: London Pride
2008: When You're Ready
2009: A Christmas Carol In Six Movements
2012: The Change
2015: NYJO 50
Compilation: The Very Best Of NYJO - 4CD Set
Compilation: Sing A Song Of Ashton - 2CD Set
2022: She Said

References

Bibliography
Ian Carr, Digby Fairweather, & Brian Priestley. Jazz: The Rough Guide.

External links
Official website
[ Discography from Allmusic]
NYJO at The Cockpit

Big bands
National youth orchestras
1965 establishments in the United Kingdom
Musical groups established in 1965
Youth organisations based in the United Kingdom
Whirlwind Recordings artists